"Run It" is a song by French DJ and producer DJ Snake featuring American rapper Rick Ross and Indonesian rapper Rich Brian. It was released by Hollywood Records, Marvel Music, and Interscope Records on 13 August 2021, from the soundtrack of the Marvel Studios' film Shang-Chi and the Legend of the Ten Rings, which premiered on 3 September 2021.

Composition
Jack Spilsbury of We Rave You wrote that, the song "featuring heavy and power synths and incredible vocals and rapping from Rick Ross and Rich Brian". It is written in the key of D major, with a tempo of 104 beats per minute.

Critical reception
Brian Bonavoglia  of DJ Times described the track "as an exhilarating anthem that sees the worlds of hip-hop and menacing mid-tempo combine into one making for one adrenaline-pumping listening experience". Jason Heffler of EDM.com commented that "Run It" as "a heart-racing banger fit for the suspenseful action sequences of a tentpole Marvel film". Oliver Tryon of Cultr praised the song "[is] perfect for the movie, a hard hitting, energetic track that [you] can envision being placed throughout a car chase or the like".

Music video
The music video was released on 14 September 2021, which appeared in the film Shang-Chi and the official soundtrack, and also starred the film's lead actor, Simu Liu. It showcases Liu "battle it out on the dance floor with the DJ Snake".

Credits and personnel
Credits adapted from AllMusic.

 Diamond Pistols – producer
 DJ Snake – composer, engineer, mixing, primary artist, producer, programming
 Christian Dold – composer
 Mercer – engineer, mixing
 Rich Brian – composer, primary artist, vocals
 Rick Ross – composer, primary artist, vocals
 SIM – composer, producer

Uses
ESPN announced that the song was used in the background music for the 2021-22 college football season and serve as the anthem for the coverage, which started on 28 August.

Charts

Weekly charts

Year-end charts

References

2021 singles
2021 songs
DJ Snake songs
Rick Ross songs
Songs written by DJ Snake
Hollywood Records singles
Interscope Records singles
Marvel Cinematic Universe songs
Shang-Chi and the Legend of the Ten Rings